Mo Agoro (born 29 January 1993) is a  international rugby league footballer who plays as a  or  forward for the Keighley Cougars in the Championship.  

Agoro has previously played for Oldham, Hunslet, Gloucestershire All Golds and Newcastle Thunder, with short loan periods at Hemel Stags and London Skolars.

Playing career
Of Nigerian and Jamaican heritage Agoro was raised in Leeds, West Yorkshire, England and played for Leeds Rhinos Academy before signing his first professional contract with Oldham at the end of 2012. After a debut appearance against North Wales Crusaders Agoro went on to play 40 games for Oldham scoring 27 tries in the 2013 and 2014 seasons.  At the end of the 2014 season he signed for Hunslet where he stayed for two seasons, including a short period in 2015 playing for Hemel Stags with whom Hunslet had a dual registration agreement. Partway through the 2016 season, finding first-team appearances at Hunslet limited,  Agoro joined Gloucestershire All Golds on loan before making the move permanent in September 2016.  With the withdrawal of the All Golds from the league at the end of 2017, Agoro joined Newcastle Thunder for 2018.  Extending his stay at Newcastle for 2019, Agoro scored 22 tries in 37 appearances before joining London Skolars on loan in July 2019.  Released by Newcastle following the conclusion of the 2019 season, Agoro joined Keighley on a two-year contract. At the end of the 2021 season Agoro extended his contract with Keighley for a further two years.

In the 2022 League One season Agoro was the division's top try scorer with 28 tries. He was one of three players nominated for the League One Player of the Year award but lost out to teammate Jack Miller.

International career
Agoro was first selected for the  national team for the Americas qualifying tournament for the 2017 World Cup and won his first (and to date only) cap as one of the interchange players in the match against  on 4 December 2015. Agoro has made eight appearances for Jamaica, most recently in a friendly against  in October 2021. In September 2022 Agoro was named in the Jamaica squad for the World Cup to be held in October and November.

References

External links
Keighley Cougars profile
Jamaica profile

1993 births
Living people
Rugby league players from Leeds
Citizens of Jamaica through descent
Jamaican rugby league players
Jamaica national rugby league team players
English rugby league players
English sportspeople of Jamaican descent
English sportspeople of Nigerian descent
Jamaican people of Nigerian descent
Gloucestershire All Golds players
Hemel Stags players
Hunslet R.L.F.C. players
Keighley Cougars players
London Skolars players
Newcastle Thunder players
Oldham R.L.F.C. players
Rugby league second-rows
Rugby league wingers